Defending champion Rod Laver successfully defended his title, defeating John Newcombe in the final, 6–4, 5–7, 6–4, 6–4 to win the gentlemen's singles tennis title at the 1969 Wimbledon Championships. It was the third leg of an eventual second Grand Slam for Laver, which remains the only Grand Slam achieved in men's singles tennis in the Open Era.

Seeds

  Rod Laver (champion)
  Tony Roche (semifinals)
  Tom Okker (quarterfinals)
  Ken Rosewall (third round)
  Arthur Ashe (semifinals)
  John Newcombe (final)
  Clark Graebner (quarterfinals)
  Cliff Drysdale (quarterfinals)
  Roy Emerson (fourth round)
  Andrés Gimeno (fourth round)
  Fred Stolle (fourth round)
  Pancho Gonzales (fourth round)
  Raymond Moore (first round)
  Bob Hewitt (first round)
  Dennis Ralston (fourth round)
  Stan Smith (fourth round)

Qualifying

Draw

Finals

Top half

Section 1

Section 2

Section 3

Section 4

Bottom half

Section 5

Section 6

Section 7

Section 8

References

External links

 1969 Wimbledon Championships – Men's draws and results at the International Tennis Federation

Men's Singles
Wimbledon Championship by year – Men's singles